The 1981 Nations motorcycle Grand Prix was the fourth race of the 1981 Grand Prix motorcycle racing season. It took place on the weekend of 8–10 May 1981 at the Autodromo Nazionale Monza.

Classification

500 cc

References

Italian motorcycle Grand Prix
Nations
Nations